Osvaldo Félix Souza (born 7 April 1981 in Jequié), known as Val Baiano, is a Brazilian footballer who plays for Penapolense.

Career
After playing for Iraty, Grêmio Maringá and Paranavaí, Val Baiano had his first chance in a bigger club when he signed for Santos in 2003. Mainly a reserve for the team, he left the club the following year and started a journeyman career having spells with many Campeonato Brasileiro Série B clubs such as Brasiliense, Ceará, Santa Cruz and São Caetano, also playing at 2004–05 Primeira Liga for Gil Vicente.

Playing for Gama, Val Baiano was the second top goalscorer from 2007 Campeonato Brasileiro Série B with 23 goals, only behind Alessandro who scored 25 times. His good form earned him a transfer to Saudi Arabian club Al-Ahli.

In 2008, he returned to Brazil to play for Grêmio Barueri, achieving promotion to 2009 Campeonato Brasileiro Série A. Losing his place in the first team by injuries, he returned to the starting eleven when Pedrão was sold. Even though he was the club's league top goalscorer, he was dropped from the team in October after he claimed that Cruzeiro offered extra money for Grêmio Barueri to beat São Paulo. He still remained one of the competition's top scorers with 18 goals, one less than Diego Tardelli and Adriano.

In early 2010, Val Baiano was released from his contract and signed for Monterrey, also playing at 2010 Copa Libertadores for the Mexican club. After only six months at the club, he joined Flamengo., playing 18 times for Flamengo at 2010 Campeonato Brasileiro Série A but only scoring 3 times. Losing his place at the first-team and not being selected by manager Vanderlei Luxemburgo, he was released from the club in February 2011.

Val Baiano later returned to Grêmio Barueri in 2011. He joined Oeste in 2012, but was released after playing only 45 minutes in 2012 Campeonato Paulista due to injuries and being overweight.

Career statistics
(Correct )

according to combined sources on the Flamengo official website and Flaestatística.

Honours
 Brasiliense
Brazilian Série B: 2004

References

External links
Osvaldo Félix Souza at Flapédia 
Val Baiano at IMScouting

1981 births
Living people
Brazilian footballers
Brazilian expatriate footballers
Campeonato Brasileiro Série A players
Primeira Liga players
Liga MX players
Iraty Sport Club players
Adap Galo Maringá Football Club players
Atlético Clube Paranavaí players
Santos FC players
Brasiliense Futebol Clube players
Ceará Sporting Club players
Santa Cruz Futebol Clube players
Associação Desportiva São Caetano players
Sociedade Esportiva do Gama players
Grêmio Barueri Futebol players
C.F. Monterrey players
CR Flamengo footballers
Oeste Futebol Clube players
Gil Vicente F.C. players
Expatriate footballers in Mexico
Expatriate footballers in Portugal
Al-Ahli Saudi FC players
People from Jequié
Saudi Professional League players
Association football forwards
Sportspeople from Bahia